The Indian Institute of Information Technology, Allahabad (IIIT-Allahabad), is a public university located in Jhalwa, Allahabad (Prayagraj), in Uttar Pradesh. It is one of the twenty-five Indian Institutes of Information Technology listed by the Ministry of Education (India), and is classified as an Institute of National Importance.

History 
The institute was established in 1999 and designated a "deemed university" in 2000. In 2014 the IIIT Act was passed, under which IIIT-A and four other Institutes of Information Technology funded by the Ministry of Human Resource Development were classed as Institutes of National Importance.

M. D. Tiwari was the first director of the institute, and he remained in that position until December 2013, when the Allahabad High Court asked him to step down, dismissing Tiwari's plea who had challenged the chancellor's order to relinquish the post upon completion of his tenure.

IIIT-A hosted seven science conclaves from 2008 to 2014, which were attended by Nobel laureates like Claude Cohen-Tannoudji, Douglas D. Osheroff, Ivan Giaever, and many others.

Academics
The curriculum of the institute lays focus on information technology, electronics and communication and related fields such as computer vision, human computer interaction and their interdisciplinary applications across other domains.

Programs 
The institute has four departments, viz. Department of Applied Sciences, Department of Electronics and Communication Engineering, Department of Information Technology, and Department of Management Studies; which offer the following academic programs:

 Bachelor of Technology (Information Technology)
 Bachelor of Technology (Electronics & Communication Engineering)
 Bachelor of Technology (IT specialization in Business Informatics)
 Master of Technology
 Master of Business Administration
 Ph.D.

Rankings 

Internationally, IIIT-Allahabad was ranked 551–600 in Asia in the QS World University Rankings of 2023. In India, IIIT-Allahabad was ranked 103 among engineering colleges by the National Institutional Ranking Framework (NIRF) in 2020. It was also ranked 10 by India Today and 24 by Outlook India in 2020.

Campus 

The 100-acre campus of IIIT-A is situated in Devghat, Jhalwa, on the outskirts of Prayagraj. Since the first phase of construction which started in 2001, academic buildings were designed on the basis of "Penrose geometry", styled on tessellations developed by the mathematical physicist Roger Penrose.

Within the Penrose layout for the campus, a central zone was marked out for the academic core consisting of an administrative building, lecture theater complex, electronic library, computer laboratories and research facilities, as student intake increased in 2009–2010. Computer Center 3 or CC-3, also known as C. V. Raman Bhavan, is a six-storied structure which was designed as a "micro campus" in itself, having classrooms, faculty rooms, research areas and computer labs under one roof.

The campus also has a state-of-the-art auditorium, sports complex, and accommodation facilities for faculty members, staff and students (with separate boys', girls' and visitors' hostels).

In 2019, the open air theatre in the campus that houses the clock tower was dedicated to Murli Manohar Joshi, who was one of the founding members of IIIT-A, as Murali Manohar Muktangan.

Student life 
The institute has a students' body known as the Students' Gymkhana.

Effervescence is the annual cultural festival of the institute. It lasts for three days and includes music, dance, drama, art, debate, and other activities.

Aparoksha is the annual technical festival of the institute. It consists of a number of events like Hack In The North — the biggest student held hackathon of North India — and various coding, designing, and robotics contests and workshops.

Asmita is the annual sports festival of the institute, in which tournaments for cricket, volleyball, swimming, athletics, chess, squash, etc. are held.

Alumni 
 Harsha Suryanarayana (Class of 2006), top-ranked competitive programmer

References

External links 
 IIIT Allahabad website

Allahabad
Engineering colleges in Allahabad
Educational institutions established in 1999
1999 establishments in Uttar Pradesh